George M. Martin (June 30, 1927 – December 17, 2022, born in New York, New York) was an American biogerontologist. He received both his B.S. in chemistry and his M.D. from the University of Washington and had been a member of its faculty since 1957. Martin was a professor emeritus (active) in the Department of Pathology, adjunct professor of genome sciences (retired) and director emeritus of the University of Washington's Alzheimer's Disease Research Center.

Career
His research involved genetic approaches to elucidate the pathobiology of aging and age-related diseases. Important highlights include the discovery of the genetic defect causing Werner syndrome and certain familial forms of Alzheimer's disease. Martin also led research leading to the first evidence that cells from arteries, especially from parts that develop severe atherosclerosis, have limited potential to divide. He and colleagues also demonstrated that senescent cells cannot be "rescued" when their cytoplasm is mixed with cytoplasm from a normal young cell. His laboratory was also the first to demonstrate the rising frequencies, with age, of somatic mutations in human epithelial cells. His recent research used genetic engineering in mice to elucidate mechanisms of aging and Alzheimer's disease.

Martin's honors included election to the Institute of Medicine of the National Academy of Sciences and a Lifetime Achievement Award of the World Alzheimer Congress. He served as the Scientific Director of the American Federation for Aging Research and as president of the Tissue Culture Association and the Gerontological Society of America. Martin was an editor and served on editorial boards of many scholarly journals, including Science, Age and Ageing, Mechanisms of Ageing and Development, Aging Cell, Ageing Research Reviews, Geriatrics and Gerontology International and Alzheimer's Disease Review.  He was also the chairman of the scientific advisory board of The Ellison Biomedical Foundation.

Martin was not as well known as some of today's leading futurists, such as Ray Kurzweil and Vernor Vinge, but some of his futuristic predictions were similar and predated those of Kurzweil and Vinge. For example, in 1971 Martin described the importance of exponential growth in science and, based on the continuation of such a trend, he outlined a hypothetical proposal for achieving "immortality" through a process now described as mind uploading:

References

External links 
 Faculty webpage and CV

Biogerontologists
1927 births
Living people
University of Washington alumni
University of Washington faculty
Life extensionists
Members of the National Academy of Medicine